The 1935 Brown Bears football team represented Brown University as an independent during the 1935 college football season. Led by tenth-year head coach Tuss McLaughry, the Bears compiled a record of 1–8.

Schedule

References

Brown
Brown Bears football seasons
Brown Bears football